Allium czelghauricum, the Czelghaurian onion, is a species of onion that is found only in Kars Province and Ardahan Province in Turkey. It can be found in montane steppe between elevations of 2,000–2,200 m. It is threatened by overgrazing and hay making.

References

czelghauricum
Critically endangered plants
Endemic flora of Turkey
Plants described in 1912